Luña del Mar Aguiliú Ribera (born 16 November 1981) is a Puerto Rican synchronized swimmer. She competed in the 2004 Summer Olympics.

References

1981 births
Living people
Synchronized swimmers at the 2004 Summer Olympics
Sportspeople from San Juan, Puerto Rico
Puerto Rican synchronized swimmers
Olympic synchronized swimmers of Puerto Rico